In theoretical computer science, communication complexity studies the amount of communication required to solve a problem when the input to the problem is distributed among two or more parties. The study of communication complexity was first introduced by Andrew Yao in 1979, while studying the problem of computation distributed among several machines.

While Alice and Bob can always succeed by having Bob send his whole -bit string to Alice (who then computes the function ), the idea here is to find clever ways of calculating  with fewer than  bits of communication. Note that, unlike in computational complexity theory, communication complexity is not concerned with the amount of computation performed by Alice or Bob, or the size of the memory used, as we generally assume nothing about the computational power of either Alice or Bob.

This abstract problem with two parties (called two-party communication complexity), and its general form with more than two parties, is relevant in many contexts. In VLSI circuit design, for example, one seeks to minimize energy used by decreasing the amount of electric signals passed between the different components during a distributed computation. The problem is also relevant in the study of data structures and in the optimization of computer networks.

Formal definition 

Alice holds an -bit string   while Bob holds an -bit string  . By communicating to each other one bit at a time (adopting some communication protocol which is agreed upon in advance), Alice and Bob wish to compute the value of  such that at least one party knows the value at the end of the communication. At this point the answer can be communicated back so that at the cost of one extra bit, both parties will know the answer.

 minimum number of bits exchanged between Alice and Bob in the worst case.

As observed above, for any function , we have .
Initially both Alice and Bob have a copy of the entire matrix  (assuming the function  is known to both parties). Then, the problem of computing the function value can be rephrased as "zeroing-in" on the corresponding matrix entry. At the start of communication, the number of choices for the value of the function on the inputs is the size of matrix, i.e. .

More formally, a set  is called a (combinatorial) rectangle if whenever  and  then . Consider the case when  bits are already exchanged between the parties. Now, for a particular , let us define a matrix

Example:  

We consider the case where Alice and Bob try to determine whether or not their input strings are equal. Formally, define the Equality function, denoted , by  if . As we demonstrate below, any deterministic communication protocol solving  requires  bits of communication in the worst case. The equality function in this case can be represented by the matrix below.

As you can see, the function only evaluates to 1 when  equals  (i.e., on the diagonal). It is also fairly easy to see how communicating a single bit divides your possibilities in half.

Theorem:  

Proof. Assume that .  This means that there exists  such that  and  have the same communication transcript .  Since this transcript defines a rectangle,  must also be 1.  By definition  and we know that equality is only true for  when .  This yields a contradiction.

This technique of proving deterministic communication lower bounds is called the fooling set technique.

Randomized communication complexity 
In the above definition, we are concerned with the number of bits that must be deterministically transmitted between two parties. Yao, in his seminal paper
answers this question by defining randomized communication complexity.

A randomized protocol  for a function  has two-sided error.

A randomized protocol is a deterministic protocol that uses an extra random string in addition to its normal input. There are two models for this: a public string is a random string that is known by both parties beforehand, while a private string is generated by one party and must be communicated to the other party. A theorem presented below shows that any public string protocol can be simulated by a private string protocol that uses O(log n) additional bits compared to the original.

Note that in the probability inequalities above, the outcome of the protocol is understood to depend only on the random string; both strings x and y remain fixed. In other words, if R(x,y) yields g(x,y,r) when using random string r, then g(x,y,r) = f(x,y) for at least 2/3 of all choices for the string r.

The randomized complexity is simply defined as the number of bits exchanged in such a protocol.

Note that it is also possible to define a randomized protocol with one-sided error, and the complexity is defined similarly.

Example: EQ 

Returning to the previous example of EQ, if certainty is not required, Alice and Bob can check for equality using only  messages. Consider the following protocol:  Assume that Alice and Bob both have access to the same random string . Alice computes  and sends this bit (call it b) to Bob. (The  is the dot product in GF(2).) If they are the same, then Bob accepts, saying x equals y. Otherwise, he rejects.

Clearly, if , then , so . If x does not equal y, it is still possible that , which would give Bob the wrong answer. How does this happen?

If x and y are not equal, they must differ in some locations:

Where  and  agree,  so those terms affect the dot products equally. We can safely ignore those terms and look only at where  and  differ. Furthermore, we can swap the bits  and  without changing whether or not the dot products are equal. This means we can swap bits so that  contains only zeros and  contains only ones:

Now, the question becomes: for some random string , what is the probability that ? Thus, when  does not equal ,
. The algorithm can be repeated many times to increase its accuracy. This fits the requirements for a randomized communication algorithm.

This shows that if Alice and Bob share a random string of length n, they can send one bit to each other to compute . In the next section, it is shown that Alice and Bob can exchange only  bits that are as good as sharing a random string of length n. Once that is shown, it follows that EQ can be computed in  messages.

Example: GH 
For yet another example of randomized communication complexity, we turn to an example known as the gap-Hamming problem (abbreviated GH). Formally, Alice and Bob both maintain binary messages,  and would like to determine if the strings are very similar or if they are not very similar. In particular, they would like to find a communication protocol requiring the transmission of as few bits as possible to compute the following partial Boolean function, 

 

Clearly, they must communicate all their bits if the protocol is to be deterministic (this is because, if there is a deterministic, strict subset of indices that Alice and Bob relay to one another, then imagine having a pair of strings that on that set disagree in  positions.

A natural question one then asks is, if we're permitted to err  of the time (over random instances  drawn uniformly at random from ), then can we get away with a protocol with fewer bits? It turns out that the answer somewhat surprisingly is no, due to a result of Chakrabarti and Regev in 2012: they show that for random instances, any procedure which is correct at least  of the time must send  bits worth of communication, which is to say essentially all of them.

Public coins versus private coins 

It is easier to create random protocols when both parties have access to the same random string (shared string protocol). It is still possible to use these protocols even when the two parties don't share a random string (private string protocol) with a small communication cost.  Any shared string random protocol using any number of random string can be simulated by a private string protocol that uses an extra O(log n) bits.

Intuitively, we can find some set of strings that has enough randomness in it to run the random protocol with only a small increase in error.  This set can be shared beforehand, and instead of drawing a random string, Alice and Bob need only agree on which string to choose from the shared set. This set is small enough that the choice can be communicated efficiently. A formal proof follows.

Consider some random protocol P with a maximum error rate of 0.1. Let  be  strings of length n, numbered .

For a fixed , we can use Hoeffding's inequality to get the following equation:

Thus when we don't have  fixed:

The last equality above holds because there are  different pairs . Since the probability does not equal 1, there is some  so that for all :

Since  has at most 0.1 error probability,  can have at most 0.2 error probability.

Quantum communication complexity 

Quantum communication complexity tries to quantify the communication reduction possible by using quantum effects during a distributed computation.

At least three quantum generalizations of communication complexity have been proposed; for a survey see the suggested text by G. Brassard.

The first one is the qubit-communication model, where the parties can use quantum communication instead of classical communication, for example by exchanging photons through an optical fiber.

In a second model the communication is still performed with classical bits, but the parties are allowed to manipulate an unlimited supply of quantum entangled states as part of their protocols. By doing measurements on their entangled states, the parties can save on classical communication during a distributed computation.

The third model involves access to previously shared entanglement in addition to qubit communication, and is the least explored of the three quantum models.

Nondeterministic communication complexity 

In nondeterministic communication complexity, Alice and Bob have access to an oracle.  After receiving the oracle's word, the parties communicate to deduce .  The nondeterministic communication complexity is then the maximum over all pairs  over the sum of number of bits exchanged and the coding length of the oracle word.

Viewed differently, this amounts to covering all 1-entries of the 0/1-matrix by combinatorial 1-rectangles (i.e., non-contiguous, non-convex submatrices, whose entries are all one (see Kushilevitz and Nisan or Dietzfelbinger et al.)).  The nondeterministic communication complexity is the binary logarithm of the rectangle covering number of the matrix: the minimum number of combinatorial 1-rectangles required to cover all 1-entries of the matrix, without covering any 0-entries.

Nondeterministic communication complexity occurs as a means to obtaining lower bounds for deterministic communication complexity (see Dietzfelbinger et al.), but also in the theory of nonnegative matrices, where it gives a lower bound on the nonnegative rank of a nonnegative matrix.

Unbounded-error communication complexity 

In the unbounded-error setting, Alice and Bob have access to a private coin and their own inputs .

Note that the requirement that the coin is private is essential. In particular, if the number of public bits shared between Alice and Bob are not counted against the communication complexity, it is easy to argue that computing any function has  communication complexity. On the other hand, both models are equivalent if the number of public bits used by Alice and Bob is counted against the protocol's total communication.

Though subtle, lower bounds on this model are extremely strong. More specifically, it is clear that any bound on problems of this class immediately imply equivalent bounds on problems in the deterministic model and the private and public coin models, but such bounds also hold immediately for nondeterministic communication models and quantum communication models.

Open problems 

Considering a 0 or 1 input matrix , the minimum number of bits exchanged to compute  deterministically in the worst case, is known to be bounded from below by the logarithm of the rank of the matrix . Since D(f) is bounded from above and below by polynomials of log rank, we can say D(f) is polynomially related to log rank. Since the rank of a matrix is polynomial time computable in the size of the matrix, such an upper bound would allow the matrix's communication complexity to be approximated in polynomial time. Note, however, that the size of the matrix itself is exponential in the size of the input.

For a randomized protocol, the number of bits exchanged in the worst case, R(f), was conjectured to be polynomially related to the following formula:

 

Such log rank conjectures are valuable because they reduce the question of a matrix's communication complexity to a question of linearly independent rows (columns) of the matrix. This particular version, called the Log-Approximate-Rank Conjecture, was recently refuted by Chattopadhyay, Mande and Sherif (2019) using a surprisingly simple counter-example. This reveals that the essence of the communication complexity problem, for example in the EQ case above, is figuring out where in the matrix the inputs are, in order to find out if they're equivalent.

Applications 
Lower bounds in communication complexity can be used to prove lower bounds in decision tree complexity, VLSI circuits, data structures, streaming algorithms, space–time tradeoffs for Turing machines and more.

See also 

 Gap-Hamming problem

Notes

References 
 
 
 Brassard, G. Quantum communication complexity: a survey. https://arxiv.org/abs/quant-ph/0101005
 Dietzfelbinger, M., J. Hromkovic, J., and G. Schnitger, "A comparison of two lower-bound methods for communication complexity", Theoret. Comput. Sci. 168, 1996. 39-51.
 Raz, Ran. "Circuit and Communication Complexity." In Computational Complexity Theory. Steven Rudich and Avi Wigderson, eds. American Mathematical Society Institute for Advanced Study, 2004. 129-137.
 A. C. Yao, "Some Complexity Questions Related to Distributed Computing", Proc. of 11th STOC, pp. 209–213, 1979. 14
 I. Newman, Private vs. Common Random Bits in Communication Complexity, Information Processing Letters 39, 1991, pp. 67–71.

Information theory
Computational complexity theory
Quantum complexity theory